Carbonia is a town and comune in the Province of South Sardinia, Sardinia, Italy. Along with Iglesias it was a co-capital of the former province of Carbonia-Iglesias, now suppressed. It is located in the south-west of the island, at about an hour by car or train from the regional capital, Cagliari.

History
 
Carbonia was founded on the 18 December 1938 by the Fascist regime. Benito Mussolini ordered the building of the city and was present at its inauguration. The city was built to provide housing for the workforce of the nearby mines. The name Carbonia comes from the Italian word for coal, abundant in the area.

Vitale Piga was appointed mayor of Carbonia and served in that capacity from September 28, 1939 to April 24, 1942. Piga authored a book on the coalfields of the Sulcis region titled Il giacimento carbonifero del Sulcis: Carbonia.

The city has grown since its founding in 1938 due to immigration from elsewhere on the island and from mainland Italy (in particular from the regions of Veneto, Sicily, Abruzzo, Marche, Basilicata and Campania), reaching about 45,000 residents in 1951. Currently it has a population of over 28,000.

Since the closing of the mines in the 1970s, Carbonia has had a high unemployment rate. After the closure of the mines the town's economy was converted to the metallurgical industry. Today most Carbonians are employed in heavy industry, and in the tertiary sector.

Main sights

Monte Sirai, a hill in the surroundings of the city that hosts the ruins of a Phoenician-Carthaginian built-up area
Domus de janas in the surroundings of Sirri and Monte Crobu
Romanesque church of Santa Maria di Flumentepido (11th century)
Former Serbariu coal mine,  now turned into a museum and a site of industrial archaeology

Government

International relations

 
Carbonia is twinned with:
 Oberhausen, Germany
 Behren-lès-Forbach, France, since 2005
 Labin, Croatia, since 2010
 Raša, Croatia, since 2010

References

External links

Official website
Carbonia

1937 establishments in Italy
States and territories established in 1937
Populated places established in 1937
Planned cities in Italy
Italian fascist architecture